Dixi is a combined office, shopping and transport centre in Tikkurila, Vantaa, Finland, in connection to the Tikkurila railway station. Dixi is located to the west of the railway track, to the north of the old station building. The shopping centre was opened in 2015 and was expanded with a  expansion in 2017, with an upcoming final phase of a further  of office space to its southern part on Ratatie.

The building contains plenty of office space and about thirty businesses, including kiosks, cafés, restaurants, special businesses, a medical station, barbershops, a gym, a service point of the city of Vantaa (Vantaa-info), VR Group ticket sales and an S-market grocery store. The bus terminal of the Tikkurila railway station was moved to Dixi with the buses driving to the open bottom floor of the shopping centre. There is a grass roof the size of a football field on top of the building.

Dixi can be accessed from the west from Ratatie, which handles the arriving connections of the bus terminal or from the railway platforms via a station bridge with a roof and glass walls connecting to the third floor. The station bridge and most of the railway platforms are actually located in the neighbouring district of Jokiniemi. However, the businesses on the station bridge are not counted as part of the Dixi shopping centre. On the other end of the station bridge is also located the Väritehtaankatu 8 office and business building in Jokiniemi, which is not part of Dixi. This building hosts offices, a lunch restaurant and a gym.

First phase
Dixi's first phase consisted of a shopping centre, an office tower, a bus station at the ground floor and a parking garage. The 250-metre-long shopping centre opened in 2015 has three floors. At the time of its opening, the shopping centre was owned by Nordic Real Estate Partners and the office tower by the Ilmarinen Mutual Pension Insurance Company. In 2019 the ownership was transferred to the Finnish eQ real estate company. Floors 4 through 11 of the office tower host premises for the Helsinki and Uusimaa Hospital District, Terveystalo and Barona.

Second and third phase
Dixi's second phase was built in the place of the former ticket sales office; the building has 12 floors and hosts office and business spaces. The business spaces of the second phase were opened on 27 April 2017.

The third phase is under planning. The additional building will have eight floors.

References

External links
 
 Official site
 The Tikkurila station at the VR Group

Shopping centres in Vantaa